The 2021 ICC Men's T20 World Cup was the seventh ICC Men's T20 World Cup tournament, which was held in United Arab Emirates and Oman. Each team selected a squad of fifteen players before 10 October 2021. The player ages are as on 17 October 2021, the opening day of the tournament, and where a player plays for more than one team in Twenty20 cricket, only their domestic team is listed (for example: at the time, Jos Buttler played for Lancashire Lightning).

Afghanistan
Afghanistan announced their initial squad on 9 September 2021.

Coach:  Lance Klusener

1After the squad was named, Rashid Khan stepped down as the team's captain, stating that the selection committee had not gained his consent for the team. Mohammad Nabi was then named as Afghanistan's captain.

2On 10 October 2021, Afghanistan named their final squad of 15 for the tournament. Afsar Zazai was removed from the reserve list, whereas Shapoor Zadran and Qais Ahmad were removed from the main squad. Sharafuddin Ashraf and Dawlat Zadran were moved to the reserve list from the main squad. Fareed Ahmad was moved to the main squad from the reserve list, whereas Samiullah Shinwari and Fazalhaq Farooqi were new additions to the reserve list.

3On 31 October 2021, Asghar Afghan announced his retirement from cricket. Sharafuddin Ashraf, one of the reserve players, was named as his replacement for the rest of the tournament.

Australia
Australia announced their squad on 18 August 2021.

Coach:  Justin Langer

Bangladesh
Bangladesh announced their squad on 9 September 2021.

Coach:  Russell Domingo

1Rubel Hossain and Aminul Islam were named as travelling reserves. 

2On 10 October 2021, Aminul Islam withdrew himself from the squad and returned home.

3On 26 October 2021, Mohammad Saifuddin was ruled out of the tournament due to a back injury, with Rubel Hossain named as his replacement.

4Shakib Al Hasan was ruled out of Bangladesh's final two Super 12 matches due to a hamstring injury.

England
England announced their squad on 9 September 2021.

Coach:  Chris Silverwood

1On 5 October 2021, Sam Curran was ruled out of England's squad due to a back injury. His brother, Tom Curran, was named as his replacement. 

2On 3 November 2021, Tymal Mills was ruled out of the rest of the tournament due to thigh strain, with Reece Topley, one of the reserves, named as his replacement. 

3Jason Roy suffered a calf injury during England's Super 12 match against South Africa, ruling him out of the rest of the tournament, with James Vince, one of the reserve players, named as his replacement.

India
India announced their squad on 8 September 2021.

Coach:  Ravi Shastri

1On 13 October 2021, Shardul Thakur replaced Axar Patel in India's squad, with Axar added to the team's list of standby player.

Ireland
Ireland announced a provisional squad of 18 players on 9 September 2021, which will be reduced to a core squad of 15 players, plus reserves, in early October. On 8 October 2021, the final 15 players were announced.

Coach:  Graham Ford

Namibia
Namibia announced their squad on 10 September 2021.

Coach:  Pierre de Bruyn

Netherlands
The Netherlands announced their squad on 10 September 2021.

Coach:  Ryan Campbell

New Zealand
New Zealand announced their squad on 10 August 2021.

Coach:  Gary Stead

1Adam Milne was named as injury cover, and replaced Lockie Ferguson in New Zealand's squad, after Ferguson suffered a calf tear.

2Devon Conway was ruled out of New Zealand's squad for the final of the tournament after breaking his hand during the semi-final match against England.

Oman
Oman announced their squad on 8 September 2021.

Coach:  Duleep Mendis

Pakistan
Pakistan announced their squad on 6 September 2021.

Coach:  Saqlain Mushtaq

1 2On 8 October 2021, Pakistan updated their squad, with Sarfaraz Ahmed and Haider Ali replacing Azam Khan and Mohammad Hasnain.

3Fakhar Zaman was also moved from the reserve list to the full team in place of Khushdil Shah.

4The following day, Sohaib Maqsood was ruled out of Pakistan's squad due to a back injury, with Shoaib Malik named as his replacement.

Papua New Guinea
Papua New Guinea announced their squad on 24 August 2021.

Coach:  Carl Sandri

Scotland
Scotland announced a provisional squad of 17 players on 9 September 2021, which was reduced to 15 players and two reserves on 10 October 2021.

Coach:  Shane Burger

1Josh Davey was ruled out of Scotland's squad for their final three matches due to a groin injury. Michael Jones who was initially in the reserves list was named as his replacement.

South Africa
South Africa announced their squad on 9 September 2021.

Coach:  Mark Boucher

Sri Lanka
Sri Lanka announced their squad on 12 September 2021.

Coach:  Mickey Arthur

1Akila Dananjaya, Binura Fernando, Lahiru Kumara and Pulina Tharanga were named as reserve players.

2On 1 October 2021, Sri Lanka added Pathum Nissanka, Minod Bhanuka, Ashen Bandara, Lakshan Sandakan and Ramesh Mendis to their squad.

3Lahiru Madushanka was ruled out of Sri Lanka's squad due to a fractured collarbone,
with Minod Bhanuka named as his replacement.

4Sri Lanka announced their final squad for the tournament on 10 October 2021. Kamindu Mendis, Nuwan Pradeep, Praveen Jayawickrama, and Minod Bhanuka were removed from the squad. Akila Dananjaya, Lahiru Kumara, Binura Fernando, and Pathum Nissanka were added to the squad.

5On 16 October 2021, Shiran Fernando was also added to Sri Lanka's squad as a reserve player.

West Indies
The West Indies announced their squad on 9 September 2021.

Coach:  Phil Simmons

1On 20 October 2021, Akeal Hosein, one of the reserve players, replaced Fabian Allen, after Allen was ruled out with an ankle injury.

2On 27 October 2021, Jason Holder, one of the reserve players, replaced Obed McCoy, after McCoy was ruled out due to an injury.

References

External links
 Every squad for the ICC Men's T20 World Cup 2021 at the International Cricket Council

 
Cricket squads
ICC Men's T20 World Cup squads